FC Moush Charentsavan, is defunct Armenian football club from Charentsavan, Kotayk Province. They played their home games at the Charentsavan City Stadium which has a capacity of 5,000 spectators. 

The club was dissolved in 1994 and is currently inactive from professional football.

League Record

References

Moush Charentsavan
1994 disestablishments in Armenia